Pentila tachyroides, the mylothrid pentila, is a butterfly in the family Lycaenidae. It is found in Nigeria, Cameroon, Gabon, the Republic of the Congo, Angola, the Democratic Republic of the Congo, Uganda, Kenya and Tanzania. The habitat consists of forests.

Adults are on wing in November and December.

Subspecies
Pentila tachyroides tachyroides (southern Nigeria, Cameroon, Gabon, Congo, Angola, Democratic Republic of the Congo, Uganda, western Kenya, north-western Tanzania)
Pentila tachyroides isiro Berger, 1981 (Democratic Republic of the Congo: Mongala, Uele, Ituri, Kivu, Tshuapa, Equateur and Sankuru)

References

Butterflies described in 1879
Poritiinae
Butterflies of Africa
Taxa named by Hermann Dewitz